"(Nothing Serious) Just Buggin'" is the debut single by American hip hop/R&B group Whistle, from their 1986 eponymous debut album. It was first released as a single in 1985, and was a top ten hit and the group's only major success in the UK, where it peaked at No. 7 on the UK Singles Chart in early 1986. On the U.S. Billboard R&B and dance charts, it reached numbers 17 and 18, respectively.

Track listings 
7"

 "(Nothing Serious) Just Buggin'" – 3:46
 "Buggin' Much Hard" – 4:10

7" (Alternative Netherlands release)

 "Just Buggin' (Nothing Serious)" – 4:15
 "Just Buggin' Much Hard" (Dub Version) – 4:00

12"

 "(Nothing Serious) Just Buggin'" – 5:03
 "Buggin' Much Hard" – 5:36

12" (Alternative Netherlands release)

 "(Nothing Serious) Just Buggin'" (Minimix) – 7:23
 "Just Buggin' Much Hard" (Bug-Bug Mix) – 5:36

Charts

References

1985 songs
1985 debut singles
American hip hop songs
Select Records singles
Ariola Records singles
CBS Records singles